Aira Ferreira (born April 21, 1997) is a Brazilian fashion model.

Career
Ferreira debuted at Alberta Ferretti in 2016. The next year she walked for Christian Dior, Tommy Hilfiger, JW Anderson, Roland Mouret, Missoni, Versace, Bottega Veneta, Dolce & Gabbana, Saint Laurent, Coach New York, Elie Saab, Chanel, Giambattista Valli, Victoria Beckham, Brandon Maxwell, Tory Burch, Erdem, Azzedine Alaïa, Zara, and Tom Ford. Ferreira appeared in an Elle Italia editorial in June 2019.

Ferreira has modeled in advertising campaigns for brands including Michael Kors, Calvin Klein Collection, and Prabal Gurung. Ferreira was also cast in campaigns for Prada.

Ferreira currently ranks as a "Money Girl" on models.com.

References

External links
models.com bio

Living people
1997 births
Brazilian female models
People from Fortaleza